Ali Bader (Arabic علي بدر) is an Iraqi novelist, poet, poetry translator, script writer, critic, regarded as the most significant writer to emerge in Arabic world, in the last decade. author of fifteen works of fiction, and several works of non-fiction. His best-known works include Papa Sartre, The Tobacco Keeper, The Running after the Wolves, and The Sinful Woman, several of which have won awards. His novels are quite unlike any other fictions in Arabic world of our day, as they blend character study, social criticism, philosophical reflection, and explicit language. Bader was born in Baghdad, where he studied western philosophy and French literature. He now lives in Brussels. In addition to his work as an author, he is also journalist. He is working as Editor-in-Chief of Eurolitkrant an interdisciplinary and literary journal. https://eurolitkrant.com/IndexEn.aspx.

Biography
Bader was born in Baghdad where he studied western Philosophy and French Literature. 
He is the author of 15 novels and works also as editor in chief of Alca Books, a distinctive Arabic publishing house. 
In 2001, he published his seminal novel, Papa Sartre (Arabic: بابا سارتر). The focus of the novel is the 1960s generation, whom he sought to critique for the negative impact of their cultural influence still felt by the current generation today. In particular, the novel highlights the trials and tribulations of the pseudo-intellectuals of sixties Baghdad in parody form. It also includes memorable portrayals of Iraq's wealthy and influential families in their decline. For this work, he was awarded the State Prize for Literature in Baghdad in 2002 and the Tunisian Abu Al-Qassem Al-Shabi Award. Following its critical acclaim in the Arab world, it was translated into English

In 2002, his novel The Family's Winter (Arabic: شتاء العائلة) appeared, revisiting with the decay of the decline of Iraq's elite, but this time focusing on the aristocracy in the 1950s. That same year, he received Prize of Literary Creativity in the United Arab Emirates.

Following his work on The Family's Winter, Bader completed his 2003 novel entitled The Road to Mutran Hill. In it, he dealt with Iraqi social problems and the increasing division among its numerous segments, prophesying the disintegration of Iraq's already tattered socioeconomic fabric.

In 2004, he followed up with another novel, The Naked Feast (Arabic: الوليمة العارية), exploring the emergence of the Iraqi intelligentsia at the beginning of the 20th century. Bader's novel Tumult, Women and a Sunken Writer (2005) is his most popular piece that depicts the marginalized generation of Iraqi poets and novelists in the 1990s under Saddam Hussein's dictatorship and the international sanctions. One of the essays he published is called "Mid-night Maps", set during a journey to Iran, Turkey and Algeria, for which he was given the Ibn Battuta Prize for Contemporary Journeys. In 2006, Bader published his novel Jerusalem Lantern, a fictional portrayal of Edward Said.

In 2007 his novel Running after the Wolves, which highlights the Iraqi intellectuals who fled to Africa because of persecution under Saddam Hussein's dictatorship continued to increase his stature in Arab literary circles. In 2008, his novel the Tobacco keeper, highlighted the cultural life after the tumultuous events of 2003. At the center of the novel is the life of an Iraqi Jewish musician killed in Baghdad in 2006, and his struggle as an artist to integrate into Iraqi society. Critics welcomed the novel, resulting in its nomination for the Arab Booker Prize. In 2009, he published his novel titled Kings of the Sand about the conflict between Iraqi army and the inhabitants of desert, which was a bestseller in Arab book fairs.
In 2010 he published Crime, Art, and Dictionary of Baghdad, a novel about the secremantal and philosophical schools in Abbasid era.
Ali Bader has also written some non-fiction books, including Massignion in Baghdad (2005), Sleeping Prince and Waiting Campaign (2006), and Shahadat: Witnessing Iraq's Transformation after 2003 (2007) Adding to his awards for fiction writing, MNSG: Navigation between Home and Exile (2008) won Bader the Every Human Has Rights Media Award of 2008

In addition to fiction and non-fiction, he is a columnist in the Arabic newspapers, among them Al-Hayat, Al-Mada, Al-Dustour and Al-Riyadh. His journalism career has included assignments as a war correspondent.

Bibliography

Novels
 Papa Sartre (2001) Translated into English 
 Family's Winter (2002)
 The Naked Feast (2003)
 The Road to Moutran Hill (2004)
 Tumult, Women, and obscured Writer (2005)
 Jerusalem Lantern, novel about Edward Saed (2006)
 Running After the Wolves (2007)
The Tobacco Keeper (2008) (Long list Arab Booker Prize) Translated into English, Bloomsbury, 2011
 Kings of the Sands (2009)(Long list Arab Booker Prize)
 Crime, Art, and Baghdad Dictionary (2010)
 The professors of illusion (2011)
 The infidel woman    (2015)
 The musician of the claude (2016)
 Liars get every things (2017)
 The killers' Party - (collection of short Stories) (2018)
 The Exiles Journal 2019 
 Last Words of a Filipina Sex Worker in Dubai 2020
 The Invited to the lady’s evening  2022

English anthology of fiction
 Baghdad Noir, Akashic books 2018 
 Iraq+100, Comma press, One of NPR's Best Books of 2017!

Poetry
 Book  of the Trade: Baghdad in 1898, ethnographic poems (2000)
 Crimes of velvet and cream (2002)
 Book of assassins (2004)
 Book of the desert (2005)
Book of erotic man (2009)
Book of the happy exiled (2012)

Essays
 An invitation card to celebrities party (2010)
 Mid-night Maps (2006)
 Massignion in Baghdad (2005)
 Sleeping prince and waiting campaign (2005)
 Shahadat: witnessing Iraq's transformation after 2003

Theater 
 2004 The world of non married women
 2009 The tavern of immigrants   
 2013 Fatima whose name is Sophie.

Films
 Under the Ashes with Ziad T. Jazzaa
 The Story of Iraqi literature

Awards and grants
 Mario Lattes Prize, shortlist for the novel Plying with the Clouds, Italian edition, published by Argo. (Roma 2019)
 Sheikh Hamad Award for Translation and International Understanding for the French translation of Papa Sartre's novel, published by Edition du Seuil. (2016 Doha)
 Saint Eden-Banipal Scholarship at the University of Durham in Britain. (2014 UK)
 Scholarship at the House of chines writers in Shanghai. (2013 Shanghai)
 Heinrich Boll scholarship in Germany. (2010 Cologne)
 Longlisted for Arab Booker Prize, the novel Kings of the Sands. (2009) 
 The Every Human Has Rights Award, the international award for journalistic reporting, for the book Navigating the Space Between Home and Exile.(2008,Paris)
 Longlisted, the Arab Booker Prize for the novel The Tobacco Keeper. (2008)
 Medal of Honor from the Algerian National Library for writing about literature and exile.(2007)  
 Ibn Battuta Prize for Traveling Books (Abu Dhabi 2005)
 Prize of Literary Creativity (U E A 2004)
 Abu al-Qassim Al-Shabi Prize for PAPA SARTRE(Tunis 2003)
 State Prize of literature for PAPA SARTRE (Baghdad 2002)

References

External links
 https://web.archive.org/web/20190706061124/http://maakom.com/site/article/126 https://web.archive.org/web/20110727171825/http://penatlas.org/online/index2.php?option=com_content&do_pdf=1&id=445
 Ali Bader at the Berlin International Literature Festival 2009
 
 http://www.alriyadh.com/2006/10/03/article191255.html
 Ali Bader, Banipal

Iraqi journalists
21st-century Iraqi poets
Iraqi soldiers
Iraqi translators
Living people
Writers from Baghdad
University of Baghdad alumni
1979 births
Novelists
20th-century Iraqi poets
20th-century short story writers
20th-century novelists